Ashlynn Yennie is an American actress from Riverton, Wyoming. She is best known for her role in the 2009 Dutch horror film The Human Centipede (First Sequence) and its 2011 sequel. In 2016, Yennie played Ashley in the Showtime TV mini-series Submission.

Career
Yennie's first major role in a feature film was as Jenny in the 2009 Dutch horror film, The Human Centipede (First Sequence). She appeared as herself in the sequel The Human Centipede 2 (Full Sequence). She has appeared in several television shows including guest star roles on Undateable and NCIS. She has also appeared in films such as Fractured, The Scribbler, The Divorce Party, The Ghost and the Whale, and Fear, Inc.

Filmography

Film

Television

References

External links 

 

Living people
American film actresses
American television actresses
People from Riverton, Wyoming
Actresses from Wyoming
Actresses from New York City
21st-century American actresses
Year of birth missing (living people)